Michel Lemoine (1922–2013) was a French actor and film director.

Selected filmography

Actor

 After Love (1948)
 Julie de Carneilhan (1950)
 The Treasure of Cantenac (1950)
 The Crossroads (1951)
 Open Letter (1953)
 The Prisoner of the Iron Mask (1962)
 Planets Against Us (1962)
 Hercules vs. Moloch (1963)
 The Bread Peddler (1963)
 The Road to Fort Alamo (1964)
 Mission to Caracas (1965)
 The Lost Woman (1966)

References

Bibliography
 Senn, Bryan. The Most Dangerous Cinema: People Hunting People on Film. McFarland, 2013.

External links

1922 births
2013 deaths
People from Pantin
French male film actors
French pornographic film directors